Spikeld (1993-2017) was a Norwegian trotting horse, from Elding and Spikdona. He was trained by Kjell Håkonsen. The horse's height was 158 cm. It set a best time for a 7-year old horse with a kilometre time of 1:18.6.

Spikeld  retired in 2006. After his racing career he was active as a breeding stallion.

Spikeld was euthanized in September 2017.

Racing career 
Starts: 186
1st places: 127
2nd places: 15
3rd places: 10

References 

Norwegian Standardbred racehorses
1993 racehorse births
2017 racehorse deaths